Anna Airy (6 June 1882 – 23 October 1964) was an English oil painter, pastel artist and etcher. She was one of the first women officially commissioned as a war artist and was recognised as one of the leading women artists of her generation.

Early life
Airy was born in Greenwich, London, the daughter of an engineer, Wilfrid Airy, and Anna née Listing, and the granddaughter of the Astronomer Royal George Biddell Airy. Airy trained at the Slade School of Fine Art in London from 1899 to 1903, where she studied alongside William Orpen and Augustus John, and under Fred Brown, Henry Tonks and Philip Wilson Steer. Airy won prizes at the Slade School for portrait, figure, and other subjects including the Slade School Scholarship in 1902. She also won the Melville Nettleship Prize in 1900, 1901 and 1902.

Work

During World War I, Airy was given commissions in a number of factories and painted her canvases on site in often difficult and, sometimes, dangerous conditions. For example, while working at great speed to paint A Shell Forge at a National Projectile Factory, Hackney Marshes, London in an extremely hot environment, "the ground became so hot that her shoes were burnt off her feet". This painting was featured in an exhibition at the Imperial War Museum's 2011–2012 exhibition Women War Artists.

In June 1918 the Munitions Committee of the Imperial War Museum, IWM. commissioned her to create four paintings representing typical scenes in four munitions factories: These included, 
 National Projectile Factory at Hackney;
 National Filling Factory at Chilwell, Nottingham, W G Armstrong Whitworth's at Nottingham;
 Aircraft Manufacturing Co. at Hendon;
 South Metropolitan Gas Co.
The Chilwell commission was replaced by a request for a painting of work at the Singer factory in Glasgow. Airy was also commissioned by the Women's Work Section of the IWM during the war. In 1917 she was commissioned by the Canadian War Memorials Fund; and in 1940 by the Ministry of Munitions. Her work was also part of the art competitions at the 1928 Summer Olympics and the 1932 Summer Olympics.

Airy was married to the artist Geoffrey Buckingham Pocock and for many years the couple lived at Haverstock Hill in Hampstead before moving to Playford near Ipswich.

Exhibitions
Airy's work was exhibited at the Royal Academy in 1905 and in each subsequent year there until 1956, her first one-woman exhibition having been held at the Carfax Gallery in 1908. Airy also exhibited at exhibitions at the Paris Salon and in Italy, Canada and in the United States. She has been represented in the British Museum; the Victoria and Albert Museum; and the Imperial War Museum. Her work also appeared in the Art Gallery of New South Wales, Sydney as well as in Auckland, New Zealand; Vancouver and Ottawa in Canada; and in the Corporation Art Galleries of Liverpool, Leeds, Huddersfield, Birkenhead, Blackpool, Rochdale, Ipswich, Doncaster, Lincoln, Harrogate, Paisley and Newport. A painting by Airy, The Golden Plum Tree, shown at a 1916 exhibition of works by female artists was acquired by Queen Mary. Her etching Forerunners of Fruit (c.1925) is in the collection of the Art Gallery of New South Wales.

Publications
Airy is the author of:
 The Art of Pastel (1930)	London: Winsor & Newton
 Making a Start in Art (1951) Studio Publications London, New York

Memberships
Airy was a member of several artistic societies. She was elected as a member of The Pastel Society in 1906. She also joined the Royal Society of Painters and Etchers in 1908 when the society elected her. She was also an elected member of the Royal Institute of Oil Painters (1909),  Royal Institute of Painters in Water Colours (1918), and Member of the Royal Glasgow Institute of the Fine Arts (1952). She was elected as the President of the Ipswich Art Society in 1945.

References

External links

 

1882 births
1964 deaths
20th-century British printmakers
20th-century English painters
20th-century English women artists
Anna
Alumni of the Slade School of Fine Art
Artists commissioned by the Imperial War Museum
Artists from London
British war artists
English etchers
English printmakers
Members of the Royal Institute of Painters in Water Colours
Members of the Royal Institute of Oil Painters
Olympic competitors in art competitions
People from Greenwich
Women etchers
Pastel artists